Antonio Senosa (born 18 November 1935) is a Filipino wrestler. He competed at the 1964 Summer Olympics and the 1968 Summer Olympics.

References

External links
 

1935 births
Living people
Filipino male sport wrestlers
Olympic wrestlers of the Philippines
Wrestlers at the 1964 Summer Olympics
Wrestlers at the 1968 Summer Olympics
Sportspeople from Iloilo City
Wrestlers at the 1962 Asian Games
Asian Games competitors for the Philippines